Fréjus was an Italian professional cycling team that existed from 1935 to 1956. Its main sponsor was the Italian bicycle manufacturer . Whilst with Fréjus, Giovanni Valetti won the general classification of the Giro d'Italia in 1938 and 1939.

References

External links

Defunct cycling teams based in Italy
1935 establishments in Italy
1956 disestablishments in Italy
Cycling teams established in 1935
Cycling teams disestablished in 1956